Charles Roy Lancaster CBE (born 1937) is a British plantsman, gardener, author and broadcaster.

Background
Charles Roy Lancaster was born in Farnworth, Lancashire and is most widely known for his work on the long running BBC TV programme, Gardeners' World. He has also regularly appeared on the BBC Radio show Gardeners' Question Time and is also a freelance writer and lecturer.

Formerly the first Curator of the Hillier Arboretum (now the Sir Harold Hillier Gardens), he has travelled the world on plant finding expeditions but is also busy in the UK. He has been a member of the Royal Horticultural Society for almost 40 years, and is vice-chairman of the society's Floral Committee B and a member of several other committees. 
Mr Lancaster is also President of the Hardy Plant Society; a UK-based horticultural society that fosters interest in hardy herbaceous plants.

Honours 
Lancaster was awarded both the Veitch Memorial Medal (1972) and the Victoria Medal of Honour (1988) by the Royal Horticultural Society.  In the 1999 New Year Honours, he was appointed Officer of the Order of the British Empire (OBE) "for services to horticulture". In the 2014 Birthday Honours, he was promoted to Commander of the Order of the British Empire (CBE) "for services to horticulture and charity".

References

1937 births
People from Farnworth
Living people
English television presenters
English gardeners
English garden writers
Commanders of the Order of the British Empire
Veitch Memorial Medal recipients
Victoria Medal of Honour recipients